The 12971 / 72 Bandra Terminus–Bhavnagar Terminus Superfast Express is a Superfast Express train belonging to Indian Railways – Western Railway zone that runs between Bandra Terminus and Bhavnagar Terminus in India. From 15 June, 2022, it runs with highly refurbished LHB coaches.

Coaches

The 12971 / 72 Bandra Terminus–Bhavnagar Terminus Superfast Express presently has 1 first AC coach, 2AC 2 tier, 6 AC 3 tier, 8 Sleeper class, 3 General Unreserved & 2 EOG coaches. It does not have a pantry car.

As is customary with most train services in India, coach composition may be amended at the discretion of Indian Railways depending on demand.

Service

The 12971 Bandra Terminus–Bhavnagar Terminus Superfast Express covers the distance of 780 kilometres in 13 hours 5 mins (57.28 km/hr) and in 13 hours 45 mins as 12972 Bhavnagar Terminus–Bandra Terminus Superfast Express (56.24 km/hr).

As the average speed of the train is above 55 km/hr, as per Indian Railways rules, its fare includes a Superfast surcharge.

Route and Halts

Traction

It is hauled by a Vadodara Loco Shed-based WAP 7 or WAP 5 for its entire jourmey.

Rake Sharing 
The train shares its rake with 19217/18 Saurashtra Janta Express

Timings 
12971/72 Bandra Terminus Bhavnagar Terminus Superfast Express leaves Bandra Terminus everyday at 19:10 hrs IST and reaches everyday at Bhavnagar Terminus at 8:15 hrs IST.

12972/71 Bhavnagar Terminus Bandra Terminus Superfast Express leaves Bhavnagar Terminus everyday at 18:30 hrs IST and reaches everyday at Bandra Terminus at 8:15 hrs IST.

References

External links

Transport in Bhavnagar
Transport in Mumbai
Express trains in India
Rail transport in Maharashtra
Rail transport in Gujarat